KYT may refer to:

 , Japan
 IATA airport code of Kyauktu Airport, Myanmar
 Kyt Selaidopoulos (born 1978), a former Canadian soccer player
 Kayagar language, by ISO 639-3 language code
 Koyote, a South Korean co-ed vocal group
 WKYT-TV, Lexington, Kentucky, United States

See also
 KYTV (TV)